Mark Stuart Parton (born 24 September 1966) is an Australian politician. He has been a Liberal member of the Australian Capital Territory Legislative Assembly since 2016, representing the electorate of Brindabella. He was a long-running local radio announcer on 2CC before entering politics.

Parton is a frequent user of the social media platform TikTok, and was briefly ejected from ACT's parliament after releasing a video that was alleged to breach parliamentary filming rules.

References

1966 births
Living people
Liberal Party of Australia members of the Australian Capital Territory Legislative Assembly
Members of the Australian Capital Territory Legislative Assembly
21st-century Australian politicians